Howlock Mountain is a heavily eroded shield volcano in the Cascade Range of central Oregon, located along the Cascade Crest just north of Mount Thielsen.  Ice Age glaciers eroded away most of the flanks of the volcano, leaving numerous deep cirques surrounding a central ridge capped by several horns. The summit of Howlock Mountain lies along the border between Douglas County and Klamath County.

References

Further reading

External links 
 
 

Shield volcanoes of the United States
Subduction volcanoes
Cascade Volcanoes
Volcanoes of Oregon
Mountains of Oregon
Landforms of Douglas County, Oregon
Mountains of Klamath County, Oregon
Umpqua National Forest
Mountains of Douglas County, Oregon
Volcanoes of Klamath County, Oregon